Biomphalaria straminea is a species of air-breathing freshwater snail, an aquatic pulmonate gastropod mollusk in the family Planorbidae, the ram's horn snails.

This snail is a medically important pest, because an intermediate host for the parasite Schistosoma mansoni and a vector of schistosomiasis.

The history of these discoveries was summarized by Paraense (2001).

The shell of this species, like all planorbids is sinistral in coiling, but is carried upside down and thus appears to be dextral.

Distribution 
Biomphalaria glabrata is a Neotropical species. It occurs in:

 Caribbean: Saint Lucia – reported since 1993
 northeast of Brazil

This species has recently expanded its native range. As an introduced species, it occurs in:

 Hong Kong and Southern China - firstly collected in 1973 in the Lam Tsuen valley in Hong Kong, in has now been identified at a number of locations in Hong Kong and Guangdong Province.

Phylogeny 
To allow comparisons with other mollusc genomes, a high-quality genome assembly for B. straminea together with accompanying transcriptomes has been sequenced, producing a 1.005 Gb in size reference genome consisting of 36 chromosomes.

A cladogram showing phylogenic relations of species in the genus Biomphalaria:

Parasites 
Biomphalaria straminea is an intermediate host for Schistosoma mansoni and a vector of intestinal schistosomiasis. Schistosoma mansoni came to Neotropics from Africa in context of the slave trade. Schistosoma mansoni was not able to infect Biomphalaria straminea previously and it has adapted to this host.

References

Further reading

External links 

Biomphalaria
Gastropods described in 1848